Jonesville may refer to:

Locations in the United States 
Jonesville, California
Jonesville, Florida
Jonesville, Illinois
Jonesville, Indiana
Jonesville, Louisiana
Jonesville, Michigan
Jonesville, New York
Jonesville, North Carolina
Jonesville, South Carolina
Jonesville, Texas
Jonesville, Vermont
Jonesville, Virginia

See also 
 Jonestown